The flag of Kabardino-Balkaria in the Russian Federation is a horizontal tricolour, charged with a white silhouette of Mount Elbrus, the highest mountain in Europe, in the center.  The colors are arranged in the order of light blue, white, and green, with the charge of Mount Elbrus following the same order.

The flag was adopted on July 21, 1994; its proportions are 2:3.

Description

The flag of Kabardino-Balkaria within Russia is a panel of three equal horizontal stripes. The top stripe is light blue, the middle stripe is white, and the bottom stripe is green. In the center of the white stripe is a circle crossed by a light-blue and green field. On a light-blue field is a stylized image of Mount Elbrus in white. The ratio of the flag's width to its length is 2:3.

The light-blue color on the flag symbolizes the boundless and clear sky of the Kabardino-Balkarian land, as well as its rivers and waters. Also, the blue color is also revered among the Turkic peoples, and the Balkars, considered one of the two titular peoples of the Kabardino-Balkarian Republic, are an Alanian and Turkic-speaking people. White is a symbol of peace and purity, as well as Islam, which is the traditional religion in the republic. The green color is also revered in Islam, being also the personification of fertility and beauty, the beautiful nature of Kabardino-Balkaria, and also revered by the Kabardians (Adyghe people) – one of the two titular peoples of this republic.

Color scheme

External links

Flag
Flags of the federal subjects of Russia
Flags introduced in 1994
Kabardino